The Lottery Man is a lost 1919 American silent comedy film directed by James Cruze and starring Wallace Reid and Wanda Hawley. It is based on a 1909 Broadway play, The Lottery Man, by Rida Johnson Young. In the play Cyril Scott and Janet Beecher played the roles that Reid and Hawley play in the film. Famous Players-Lasky produced and Paramount Pictures distributed.

A version of The Lottery Man made in 1916 still exists.

Cast

See also
Wallace Reid filmography

References

External links

1919 films
American silent feature films
Lost American films
Films directed by James Cruze
American films based on plays
Paramount Pictures films
1919 comedy films
American black-and-white films
Silent American comedy films
1919 lost films
Lost comedy films
Films about lotteries
1910s American films